Lyman Loren "Smiley" Quick (March 19, 1909 – December 23, 1979) was an American professional golfer who played on the PGA Tour in the 1940s and 1950s.

Quick was born in Centralia, Illinois, but lived most of his life in southern California in places like Inglewood and Los Angeles. He served as a combat Marine in World War II. His best year as an amateur was 1946 when he won the U.S. Amateur Public Links and was runner-up at the U.S. Amateur after missing a putt from 2 feet at Baltusrol's Lower Course giving Ted Bishop the championship. Quick played on the 1947 Walker Cup team and turned professional in 1948.

As a pro, Quick never lived up to the potential he showed as an amateur; the closest he came to winning on the PGA Tour was when he tied for first with Jack Burke Jr., Sam Snead and Dave Douglas at the 1950 Bing Crosby Pro-Am.

In his later years, he made a living gambling on the golf course with people like Titanic Thompson. Quick hustled boxing great Joe Louis out of a quarter million dollars — enough to buy an apartment in Los Angeles and a fleet of fast cars.

Amateur wins
1940 Southern California Golf Association Championship
1943 Southern California Golf Association Championship
1946 U.S. Amateur Public Links
1947 Mexican Amateur

Professional wins (6)

PGA Tour wins (1)

Other wins (5)
1948 California State Open
1949 California State Open
1951 Utah Open, Ontario Open (Canada)
1955 Northern California Open

Results in major championships
Amateur

Professional

LA = low amateur
CUT = missed the half-way cut
WD = withdrew
"T" indicates a tie for a place
R128, R64, R32, R16, QF, SF = round in which player lost in match play

Source for U.S. Open and U.S. Amateur: USGA Championship Database

Source for 1947 Amateur Championship: The Glasgow Herald, May 28, 1947, pg. 6.

U.S. national team appearances
Amateur
Walker Cup: 1947 (winners)

References

American male golfers
PGA Tour golfers
Golfers from Illinois
Golfers from California
United States Marine Corps personnel of World War II
People from Centralia, Illinois
1909 births
1979 deaths